The 2002 NCAA Division I women's soccer tournament (also known as the 2002 Women's College Cup) was the 21st annual single-elimination tournament to determine the national champion of NCAA Division I women's collegiate soccer. The semifinals and championship game were played at Mike A. Myers Stadium in Austin, Texas from December 6–8, 2002.

Portland defeated Santa Clara in the final, 2–1 (in two overtimes), to win their first national title. The Pilots (20–4–2) were coached by Clive Charles. This was only the second title match, to date, to not feature North Carolina (the other was in 1998).

The most outstanding offensive player was Christine Sinclair from Portland, and the most outstanding defensive player was Jessica Ballweg from Santa Clara. Sinclair and Ballweg, along with nine other players, were named to the All-Tournament team.

Sinclair was also the tournament's leading scorer, with a record 10 goals. This remains, as of 2015, the most goals scored by a single player during a Women's College Cup tournament.

Qualification

All Division I women's soccer programs were eligible to qualify for the tournament. The tournament field remained fixed at 64 teams.

Format
Just as before, the final two rounds, deemed the Women's College Cup, were played at a pre-determined neutral site. All other rounds were played on campus sites at the home field of the higher-seeded team. The only exceptions were the first two rounds, which were played at regional campus sites. The top sixteen teams, only eight of which were actually seeded, hosted four teams at their home fields during the tournament's first weekend.

National seeds

Stanford (18–1-0)
North Carolina (17–1–4)
Pepperdine (16–1–2)
Connecticut (18–2–1)
West Virginia (17–2–1)
Santa Clara (15–4–1)
UCLA (16–3-0)
Portland (14–4–2)

Records

Bracket

Stanford Bracket

Storrs Bracket

Santa Clara Bracket

Chapel Hill Bracket

College Cup

All-tournament team
Lauren Arase, Portland
Jessica Ballweg, Santa Clara (most outstanding defensive player)
Devyn Hawkins, Santa Clara
Joanna Lohman, Penn State
Erin Misaki, Portland
Lauren Orlandos, Portland
Catherine Reddick, North Carolina
Christine Sinclair, Portland (most outstanding offensive player)
Lindsay Tarpley, North Carolina
Aly Wagner, Santa Clara
Veronica Zepeda, Santa Clara

See also 
 NCAA Women's Soccer Championships (Division II, Division III)
 NCAA Men's Soccer Championships (Division I, Division II, Division III)

References

NCAA
NCAA Women's Soccer Championship
 
NCAA Division I Women's Soccer Tournament
NCAA Division I Women's Soccer Tournament
NCAA Division I Women's Soccer Tournament